Wahlenbergiella is a genus of saxicolous (rock-dwelling), crustose lichens in the family Verrucariaceae. It has three species, all of which live in marine intertidal zones where they get periodically immersed in seawater. Wahlenbergiella closely resembles another lichen genus that includes marine species, Hydropunctaria. Wahlenbergiella was circumscribed in 2009 by Cécile Gueidan and Holger Thüs. They initially included two species: W. striatula, and the type,W. mucosa. The generic name honours Swedish naturalist Göran Wahlenberg, who originally described both of these species.

Species

Wahlenbergiella mucosa 
Wahlenbergiella striatula 
Wahlenbergiella tavaresiae

References

Verrucariales
Taxa described in 2009
Marine fungi
Lichen genera
Eurotiomycetes genera
Taxa named by Cécile Gueidan